Argyrophis trangensis, also known as the Trang blind snake or Trang worm snake, is a species of snake in the Typhlopidae family.

References

trangensis
Reptiles described in 1962